John Graham Vowell (February 27, 1895 – November 17, 1963) was an American football player for the Tennessee Volunteers, of the University of Tennessee. He was the school's first All-American. Vowell was inducted into the Tennessee Sports Hall of Fame for 2017.

Early years
John Graham was born on February 27, 1895, in Martin, Tennessee, to John A. Vowell and Emma Floyd Wilson.

University of Tennessee

1914
Vowell played mostly at end and was a member of the 1914 SIAA champion Vols; the program's first championship of any kind. He scored three touchdowns in that season's final game against Kentucky.

1916

Vowell scored the winning touchdown in the victory over Vanderbilt in 1916 immediately dubbed the upset of the season. He was selected All-Southern in 1916, a year in which he was captain and helped lead the Volunteers to an 8–0–1 record and a share of the SIAA championship. Walter Camp placed Vowell on his All-America third-team.  His older brother Morris Vowell was a tackle on some of the same teams. Graham and his family worked in the lumber business.

1921
Vowell came back in 1921, and was given a gold watch by Knoxville fans.

Florida
He retired to Florida in 1954.

References

External links
Tennessee Sports Hall of Fame

American football ends
American football fullbacks
People from Martin, Tennessee
All-Southern college football players
Tennessee Volunteers football players
Players of American football from Tennessee
1895 births
1963 deaths